Topuria is a Georgian surname. Notable people with the surname include:
Ilia Topuria (born 1997), German-born Georgian mixed martial artist 
Keti Topuria (born 1986), Georgian singer

Surnames of Georgian origin
Georgian-language surnames